The 5th Regiment Indiana Volunteer Cavalry was a cavalry regiment that served in the Union Army during the American Civil War.

Service
The 5th Indiana Cavalry was organized at Indianapolis, Indiana as the 90th Indiana Volunteers beginning August 22, 1862 and mustered in for three-year service under the command of Colonel Felix W. Graham. (Robert R. Stewart was commissioned October 18, 1862 to command the regiment, but he declined.)

The regiment was attached to District of Western Kentucky, Department of the Ohio, to June 1863. 1st Brigade, 3rd Division, XXIII Corps, Department of the Ohio, to August 1863. 2nd Brigade, 4th Division, XXIII Corps, to October 1863. 4th Brigade, 4th Division, XXIII Corps, to November 1863. 2nd Brigade, 2nd Division, Cavalry Corps, Department of the Ohio, to May 1864. 1st Brigade, Cavalry Division, XXIII Corps, to July 1864. 2nd Brigade, Cavalry Division, XXIII Corps, to August 1864. Dismounted Cavalry Brigade, Cavalry Division, XXIII Corps, to September 1864. 1st Brigade, Cavalry Division, XXIII Corps, to September 1864. Louisville, Kentucky, to November 1864. 1st Brigade, 6th Division, Wilson's Cavalry Corps, Military Division of the Mississippi, to December 1864. 2nd Brigade, 6th Division, Cavalry corps, Military Division of the Mississippi, to June 1865.

The 5th Indiana Cavalry mustered out of service June 16, 1865.

Detailed service

The regiment moved to Louisville, Kentucky, February 28, 1863; then to Glasgow, Kentucky, March 4-11. (Companies C, F, and I moved to Louisville, Kentucky, December 1862; then to Munfordville, Kentucky, and joined the regiment at Glasgow, Kentucky, March 1863.) Operations against Morgan in Kentucky December 22, 1862, to January 2, 1863 (Companies C, F, & I). Action Burkesville Road, near Green's Chapel, December 25, 1862 (Companies C, F, & I). Scout duty from Glasgow, Kentucky, toward the Cumberland River until April 17, 1863. Expedition to the Cumberland River April 18-22. Skirmish at Cumberland River April 18. Celina April 19. Scouting in the vicinity of Glasgow until June 22. Marrow Bone Creek, Tennessee, May 18. Near Edmonton, Kentucky, June 7. Expedition from Glasgow to Burkesville and Tennessee state line June 8-10. Kettle Creek June 9. Moved to Tompkinsville June 22. Pursuit of Morgan July 4-26. Buffington Island, Ohio, July 19. March from Louisville to Glasgow July 27-August 8. Burnside's Campaign in eastern Tennessee August 16-October 17. Occupation of Knoxville, Tennessee, September 2. Rheatown September 12. Kingsport September 18. Bristol, Virginia, September 19. Zollicoffer September 20-21. Jonesborough September 21. Hall's Ford, Watauga River, September 22. Carter's Depot and Blountsville September 22. Blue Springs October 10. Henderson's Mill October 11. Rheatown October 11. Blountsville October 14. Bristol October 15. Warm Springs October 20 and 26. Knoxville Campaign November 4-December 23. Siege of Knoxville November 17-December 5. Log Mountain December 3. Walker's Ford, Clinch River, December 5. Bean's Station December 14 Blain's Cross Roads December 16-19. Clinch River December 21. Morristown Road January 16, 1864. Kimbrough's Mills January 16. Operations about Dandridge January 16-17 and January 26-28. Near Fair Garden January 27. March to Knoxville, then to Cumberland Gap January 29-February 10. March to Mt. Sterling, Kentucky, February 17-26. Duty at Mt. Sterling, Paris, and Nicholasville, Kentucky, until May 1. March to Tunnel Hill, Georgia, May 1-12. Atlanta Campaign May to September. Varnell's Station May 7 and 9. Demonstration on Dalton May 9-13. Battle of Resaca May 14-15. Cassville May 19. Operations on line of Pumpkin Vine Creek and battles about Dallas, New Hope Church, and Allatoona Hills May 25-June 5. Mt. Zion Church May 27-28. Stoneman's Hill May 29. Operations about Marietta and against Kennesaw Mountain June 10-July 2. Lost Mountain June 15-17. Allatoona June 23-25 and 30. Nickajack Creek July 2-5. Mitchell's Cross Roads July 4. Chattahoochie River July 5-17. Campbellton July 10. Marietta July 19. Stoneman's Raid to Macon July 27-August 6. Clinton and Macon July 30. Sunshine Church, Hillsboro, July 30-31 (most of the regiment captured). Dismounted men on guard duty at Decatur and Atlanta until September 13. Ordered to Louisville, Kentucky, and guard duty there until January 1865. March to Pulaski, Tennessee, January 17-February 12. Post duty at Pulaski and operations against guerrillas in that vicinity until June. Expedition from Pulaski to New Market, Alabama, May 5-13.

Casualties
The regiment lost a total of 230 men during service; 1 officer and 40 enlisted men killed or mortally wounded, 1 officer and 188 enlisted men died of disease.

Commanders
 Colonel Felix W. Graham - resigned December 15, 1863
 Colonel Thomas Harvey Butler

Notable members
 Private Louis J. Bruner, Company H - Medal of Honor recipient for action on December 2, 1863 at Walker's Ford, Tennessee

See also

 List of Indiana Civil War regiments
 Indiana in the Civil War

References
 Dyer, Frederick H. A Compendium of the War of the Rebellion (Des Moines, IA: Dyer Pub. Co.), 1908.
 Holmes, Erastus. A Hoosier in Andersonville (Bloomington, IN: AuthorHouse), 2013.  
Attribution
 

Military units and formations established in 1862
Military units and formations disestablished in 1865
Units and formations of the Union Army from Indiana